Ilias Papatheodorou (Greek: Ηλίας Παπαθεοδώρου; born 20 June 1975) is a Greek professional basketball coach, who is currently the head coach for Kolossos Rodou of the Greek Basket League. He is also the coach of the Swiss national team.

Coaching career

Clubs
Papatheodorou played basketball in the Athinaikos youth club systems in Greece, and as soon as he stopped playing youth level basketball, at age 20, he began his coaching career in the same Athinaikos club systems, working there from 1995 to 2001. He coached in the club's cadets, juniors, and senior men's teams. He became the assistant coach of the senior men's team for one season, in 2001, in the Greek lower divisions.

He then became the head coach of the Greek club Larissaikos, from 2002 to 2004, and also was Markopoulo's head coach from 2004 to 2007.

He became the head coach of the Greek club Nea Kifissia in 2007. With the club, he managed to achieve several league promotions up through the Greek lower leagues, and he led the club to the Greek top-tier level, the Greek Basket League, for the first time in its history, in 2013. He left the club in 2016.

After leaving Nea Kifissia, Papatheodorou was appointed as the head coach of the Kazakh NBL and VTB United League club Astana. With Astana, he won both the Kazakhstan League championship and the Kazakhstan Cup title. On May 27, 2017, Papatheodorou became the head coach of the Greek club PAOK, replacing Soulis Markopoulos.

On 19 June 2019, Papatheodorou signed a three-year contract with AEK Athens replacing Italian Luca Banchi.

In the summer of 2022, he returned to coaching at a club level and signed with Kolossos Rodou, replacing Ilias Kantzouris.

Greek junior national team
In 2013, Papatheodorou became the head coach of the Greek Under-18 junior national team. He has also been the head coach of the Greek Under-19 junior national team and the Greek Under-20 junior national team.

Awards and accomplishments

As a head coach

Greek junior national team
2015 FIBA Europe Under-18 Championship: 
2016 FIBA Europe Under-20 Championship Division B: 
2017 FIBA Europe Under-20 Championship:

Pro clubs
Greek 2nd Division Champion: (2013)
Kazakhstan League Champion: (2017) 
Kazakhstan Cup Winner: (2017)

References

External links
Ilias Papatheodorou at Twitter
Ilias Papatheodorou at eurobasket.com

1975 births
Living people
AEK B.C. coaches
BC Astana coaches
Greek basketball coaches
Kolossos Rodou B.C. coaches
Nea Kifissia B.C. coaches
P.A.O.K. BC coaches
Basketball players from Piraeus